James Gordon (23 October 1915 – 29 August 1996) was a Scottish football player and coach. A native of Fauldhouse, West Lothian, Gordon played for Newcastle United and Middlesbrough as a wing-half. He later worked as a coach under Brian Clough and Peter Taylor at Derby County and Nottingham Forest, and was assistant manager to Clough during his 44-day reign at Leeds United. In honour of his contribution, Gordon was allowed to lead out the Forest players at Wembley for the 1980 Football League Cup Final.

Gordon retired as a football coach in May 1981.

He was portrayed by Maurice Roëves in the 2009 film The Damned United, which focuses on Clough's management of Derby and Leeds.

References

Scottish footballers
Wishaw Juniors F.C. players
Scottish Junior Football Association players
Newcastle United F.C. players
Middlesbrough F.C. players
Footballers from West Lothian
1915 births
1996 deaths
English Football League players
Derby County F.C. non-playing staff
Leeds United F.C. non-playing staff
Nottingham Forest F.C. non-playing staff
Association football wing halves
Association football coaches
People from Fauldhouse